Legon Cities FC (formerly known as Wa All Stars FC) is a football club from Ghana currently based in Accra, Greater Accra. The club won the 2016 Ghanaian Premier League.

History
The club was founded in January 2006 through investments by Kwesi Nyantakyi in Wa, Ghana. There had been a number of First Division Clubs in the region notably Freedom Stars, Veterans and Wa United. They are a member of the Ghana Premier League. The club used to play their home games at Wa Sports Stadium formerly played in the Golden City Park in Berekum but now plays their home games at the Accra Sports Stadium.

In December 2019, the club was sold and renamed to Legon Cities F.C.

Former players 

  Panagiotis Papadopoulos

Coaches 

 Goran Barjaktarevic
 Bashir Hayford November 2020-

Former coaches 
  Mehmet Tayfun Türkmen

Honours
Ghana Premier League
Champions (1): 2016

Sponsorships 

In May 2022, the partnership between Legon Cities football club and bookmaker 1xBet was announced. 

According to the terms of the signed agreement, the betting company became the title sponsor of The Royals until 2023.

For 1xBet, this is the first experience going into a cooperation with a club from the Ghanaian Premier League.

References

External links
Ghana-pedia webpage - Wa All-Stars FC

Football clubs in Ghana
2006 establishments in Ghana
Sports clubs in Ghana
Association football clubs established in 2006
Wa, Ghana